The Airedale Terrier (often shortened to "Airedale"), also called Bingley Terrier and Waterside Terrier, is a dog breed of the terrier type that originated in the valley (dale) of the River Aire, in the West Riding of Yorkshire, England.  It is traditionally called the "King of Terriers" because it is the largest of the terrier breeds.  The Airedale was bred from the Old English Black and Tan Terrier and the Otterhound and probably some other Terrier breeds, and has contributed to other dog breeds, such as the Yorkshire Terrier. Originally bred to serve as a versatile hunting and all around working farm dog, this breed has also been used as a war dog, guide dog, and police dog in Britain. In the United States, the breed has been used to hunt big game, upland birds, and water fowl, and serve in many other working capacities.

Description

Appearance

The Airedale is the largest of the British terriers. The American Kennel Club standard specifies a very slightly smaller dog. Larger Airedales, up to  can sometimes be found in North America. They are sometimes referred to as "Oorangs" as this was the name of a kennel in Ohio in the early 1900s that produced this much larger variation, or Roosevelt Terriers.

The Airedale has a medium-length black and tan coat with a harsh topcoat and a soft undercoat. They are an alert and energetic breed, "not aggressive but fearless." It has been claimed that the larger "Oorang" type Airedales are more eager than the smaller, breed standard Airedales, but this is not necessarily so. The large type have been used for big game hunting and as family guardians or as pets, but usually do poorly in AKC (American Kennel Club) conformation shows. This larger type is also significantly more prone to hip dysplasia than the standard Airedales.

Coat
Like many terriers, the breed has a 'broken' coat, which is hard and wiry.  It is meant to be kept not so long as to appear ragged, and lies straight and close, covering body and legs. The outer coat is hard, wiry and stiff, the undercoat softer. The hardest coats are crinkly or just slightly waved. Curly soft coats are highly undesirable.

The coat is hypoallergenic, tending not to generate allergic reactions in people.

Airedales bearing undercoats are generally groomed by hand stripping where a small serrated edged knife is used to pull out loose hair from the dog's coat.  Most Airedales require frequent (6 to 8 weeks) clipping or stripping as they do not shed.

The AKC breed standard states that the correct coat color is either a black saddle, with a tan head, ears and legs; or a dark grizzle saddle (black mixed with gray and white). Grizzle that is a mix of red hair in the black, often on the area of back before the tail are often the best and harshest coats.  There are, however, examples of non-standard black-coated and "red" (tan) coated Airedales, (the solid colored Airedales are NOT able to be AKC registered, since they are deviations from breed standard and have yet to be proven 'purebred' Airedale Terriers.) There are also the short coated "Redline" type Airedales, they appear to be genetic throwbacks in looks to the Airedale's early days when the breed's coats were much shorter than today's Airedale. Even with their shorter coat they still have the same hard wiry outer coat with a soft under coat and fall well within the criteria of the breed standard and therefore can be AKC registered and most are registered.

Tail

Traditionally the fluffy tail is long and erect. In most European countries and Australia it is illegal to dock dogs' tails unless it is for the dog's benefit (e.g., if the tail is broken). This has resulted in the emergence of a spitz tail in some dogs. Selective breeding should see this change over time and the required slightly curled tail set high on the back again become common.

In other parts of the world the Airedale's tail is commonly docked within five days of birth, but this is not considered a breed standard custom. To show an Airedale in the United States, the official AKC standard states "The root of the tail should be set well up on the back. It should be carried gaily but not curled over the back. It should be of good strength and substance and of fair length."

Size
Airedales weigh approximately 50-80 pounds, being active and agile enough to perform well, while not too small to function as a physical deterrent, retriever or hunter. Some breeders have produced larger Airedale Terriers, such as the 'Oorang Airedale', developed in the 1920s.

Ex-Army captain and Airdale breeder Walter Lingo's monthly magazine "Oorang Comments" (#25, page 81), stated that "When full grown your Airedale dog will weigh from forty to fifty-five pounds and if a female will weigh slightly less. This is the standard weight, but when required, we can furnish oversized Airedales whose weight will be from sixty to one hundred pounds."

Because Lingo tried to fill orders for everyone, the Oorang strain size was never standardized. Airedales weighing from 40 to 100 pounds were produced, but for the most part they were approximately 50 pounds and 22 to 24 inches at the shoulder. In the United States, the male Airedales measure 40 to 70 pounds, with the Oorang strain typically in the 80 to 120 pound range.

Temperament

The Airedale can be used as a working dog and also as a hunting dog. Airedales exhibit some herding characteristics as well, and have a propensity to chase animals. They have no problem working with cattle and livestock. However, an Airedale that is not well trained will agitate and annoy the animals.  Airedales have generally long puppyhoods and tend to be more difficult to train in their youth.  

The Airedale Terrier, like most terriers, has been bred to hunt independently. As a result, the dog is very intelligent, independent, strong-minded, stoic, and can sometimes be stubborn. If children and Airedales are both trained correctly, Airedales can be an excellent choice for a family dog. Airedales can do well with cats and other small animals, especially when they are raised with them.  They are also very loyal to their owners. 

Albert Payson Terhune wrote of the Airedale:
"Among the mine-pits of the Aire, the various groups of miners each sought to develop a dog which could outfight and outhunt and outthink the other miner's dogs. Tests of the first-named virtues were made in inter-mine dog fights. Bit by bit, thus, an active, strong, heroic, compactly graceful and clever dog was evolved – the earliest true form of the Airedale.
 
He is swift, formidable, graceful, big of brain, an ideal chum and guard. ....To his master he is an adoring pal. To marauders he is a destructive lightning bolt."

The Airedale Terrier ranks 37th in Stanley Coren's The Intelligence of Dogs, being of above average working dog.

Health

Airedale Terriers in UK, USA, and Canadian surveys had a median lifespan of about 11.5 years, which is similar to other breeds of their size.

In a 2004 UK Kennel Club survey, the most common causes of death were cancer (39.5%), old age (14%), urologic (9%), and cardiac (7%). In a 2000–2001 USA/Canada Health Survey, the most common causes of death were cancer (38%), urologic (17%), old age (12%), and cardiac (6%) A very hardy breed, although some may suffer from eye problems, hip dysplasia and skin infections.

Airedales can be affected by hip dysplasia. 
Like most terriers, they have a propensity towards dermatitis. Skin disorders may go unnoticed in Airedales, because of their hard, dense, wiry coats. Itchy skin may be manifest as acral lick dermatitis (also known as lick granuloma; caused by licking one area excessively) or acute moist dermatitis or "hot spots" (an oppressively itchy, inflamed and oozing patch of skin, made worse by intense licking and chewing). Allergies, dietary imbalances, and under/over-productive thyroid glands are the main causes of skin conditions.

An Airedale's coat was originally designed to protect the dog from its predators—the coat was designed to come out in the claws of the predator the dog was designed to hunt, leaving the dog unharmed. Because of this, some forms of skin dermatitis can respond to hand stripping the coat. Clipping the coat cuts the dead hair, leaving dead roots within the hair follicles. It is these dead roots which can cause skin irritations. However, hand stripping removes these dead roots from the skin and stimulates new growth. 

Gastric dilatation volvulus, also known as bloat, affects Airedale Terriers. The stomach can twist and block the esophagus, causing a buildup of gas and leading to cardiovascular collapse and death. Signs of bloat include gastric distress (stomach pain), futile attempts at vomiting, and increased salivation. Bloat usually occurs when the dog is exercised too soon after eating. They will eat up to 4-6 cups of food at a time.

Due to the breed's stoic nature, injuries can go unnoticed for a time as the dog will not give obvious signs of pain or distress like whining. For example, the first indication of a cut on the foot might be limping or favoring that foot a few days after the actual injury, so owners should be aware of their pets usual movement to spot irregularities. Excessive licking of a spot may also indicate a problem other than the skin conditions listed above.

History

Airedale, a valley (dale) in the West Riding of Yorkshire, named for the River Aire that runs through it, was the birthplace of the breed. In the mid-19th century, working-class people created the Airedale Terrier by crossing the old English rough-coated Black and Tan Terrier with the Otterhound and an assortment of other breeds. In 1886, the Kennel Club of England formally recognized the Airedale Terrier breed.

In 1864 they were exhibited for the first time at a championship dog show sponsored by the Airedale Agricultural Society. They were classified under different names, including Rough Coated, Bingley and Waterside Terrier. In 1879 breed fanciers decided to call the breed the Airedale Terrier, a name accepted by the Kennel Club (England) in 1886.

Well-to-do hunters of the era were typically accompanied by a pack of hounds and several terriers, often running them both together. The hounds would scent and pursue the quarry and the terriers would "go to ground" or enter into the quarry's burrow and make the kill. Terriers were often the sporting dog of choice for the common man. Early sporting terriers needed to be big enough to tackle the quarry, but not so big as to prevent them from maneuvering through the quarry's underground lair. As a result, these terriers had to have a very high degree of courage and pluck to face the foe in a tight, dark underground den without the help of human handlers.

During the middle of the 19th century, regular sporting events took place along the River Aire in which terriers pursued the large river rats that inhabited the area. A terrier was judged on its ability to locate a "live" hole in the riverbank and then, after the rat was driven from its hole by a ferret brought along for that purpose, the terrier would pursue the rat through water until it could make a kill. As these events became more popular, demand arose for a terrier that could excel in this activity. One such terrier was developed through judicious crossings of the Black-and-Tan Terrier and bull and terrier dogs popular at the time with the Otter Hound. The result was a long-legged fellow that would soon develop into the dog we recognize today as the Airedale Terrier. This character was too big to "go to ground" in the manner of the smaller working terriers; however, it was good at everything else expected of a sporting terrier, and it was particularly adept at water work. This big terrier had other talents in addition to its skill as a ratter. Because of its hound heritage it was well equipped to pick up the scent of game and due to its size, able to tackle larger animals. It became more of a multipurpose terrier that could pursue game by powerful scenting ability, be broken to gun, and taught to retrieve. Its size and temperament made it an able guardian of farm and home. One of the colorful, but less-than legal, uses of the early Airedale Terrier was to assist its master in poaching game on the large estates that were off-limits to commoners. Rabbits, hare, and fowl were plentiful, and the Airedale could be taught to retrieve game killed by its master, or to pursue, kill, and bring it back itself.

The first imports of Airedale Terriers to North America were in the 1880s. The first Airedale to come to American shores was named Bruce. After his 1881 arrival, Bruce won the terrier class in a New York dog show.

The patriarch of the breed is considered to be CH Master Briar (1897–1906). Two of his sons, Crompton Marvel and Monarch, also made important contributions to the breed.

The first Canadian registrations are recorded in the Stud book of 1888–1889.

In 1910, the ATCA (Airedale Terrier Club of America) offered the Airedale Bowl as a perpetual trophy, which continues to this day. It is now mounted on a hardwood pedestal base, holding engraved plates with the names of the hundreds of dogs that have been awarded Best of Breed at the National Specialties.

The Airedale was extensively used in World War I to carry messages to soldiers behind enemy lines and transport mail. They were also used by the Red Cross to find wounded soldiers on the battlefield. There are numerous tales of Airedales delivering their messages despite terrible injury. An Airedale named "Jack" ran through half a mile of enemy fire, with a message attached within his collar. He arrived at headquarters with his jaw broken and one leg badly splintered, and right after he delivered the message, he dropped dead in front of its recipient.

Lieutenant Colonel  was responsible for the development of messenger and guard dogs in the British Army. He, along with his wife, established the British War Dog School at Shoeburyness in Essex, England. In 1916, they provided two Airedales (Wolf & Prince) for use as message carriers. After both dogs proved themselves in battle, Airedales were given more duties, such as locating injured soldiers on the battlefield, an idea taken from the Red Cross.

Before the adoption of the German Shepherd as the dog of choice for law enforcement and search and rescue work, the Airedale terrier often filled this role.

In 1906, Richardson tried to interest the British Police in using dogs to accompany officers, for protection on patrol at night. Mr. Geddes, Chief Goods Manager for Hull Docks in Yorkshire, was convinced after he went and saw the impressive work of police dogs in Belgium. Geddes convinced Superintendent Dobie of the North Eastern Railway Police, to arrange a plan for policing the docks. Airedale Terriers were selected for duty as police dogs because of their intelligence, good scenting abilities and their hard, wiry coats that were easy to maintain and clean.  They were trained in Hull to attack people not in uniform which could cause problems for their handlers when off duty.  The first four dogs began patrols in Hull Docks in 1908, and the scheme was later extended to other docks policed by the North Eastern Railway Police.

At the beginning of the Russo-Japanese war in 1904, the Russian embassy in London contacted Lt. Colonel Richardson for help acquiring dogs for the Russian Army, trained to take the wounded away from the battlefields. He sent terriers, mostly Airedale Terriers, for communication and sanitary services. Although these original imports perished, Airedale Terriers were reintroduced to Russia in the early 1920s for use by the Red Army. Special service dog units were created in 1923, and Airedale Terriers were used as demolition dogs, guard dogs, police tracking dogs and casualty dogs. 

Two Airedales were among the dogs lost with the sinking of the RMS Titanic.  The Airedale "Kitty" belonged to Colonel John Jacob Astor IV, the real-estate mogul, who also died in the sinking.  The second Airedale belonged to William E. Carter of Bryn Mawr, Pennsylvania. Carter, his wife and two children survived the sinking.

During the 1930s, when airedales were farmed like livestock, a few American breeders developed the Oorang Airedale offshoot.

Capt. Walter Lingo, of LaRue, Ohio, developed the Oorang Airedale strain. The name came from a line of bench champions, headed by King Oorang 11, a dog which was said to have been the finest utility dog. King could retrieve waterfowl and upland game, tree raccoons, drive cattle and sheep, and bay mountain lions, bears, and wolves. King even fought one of the best fighting bull terriers, and killed his opponent. He also trained in Red Cross work, and served the American Expeditionary Force at the front in France.

Lingo simply wasn't satisfied with the average strain of Airedale, and after an incredible series of breedings, for which he brought in great Airedales from all over the world, he created the "King Oorang." At the time, Field and Stream magazine called it, "the greatest utility dog in the history of the world." The Oorang Kennel Company continued until Walter Lingo's death in 1969. To help promote the King Oorang, as well as his kennels, Lingo created the Oorang Indians football team headed up by Jim Thorpe. The team played in National Football League from 1922–1923. Jerry Siebert, an Airedale breeder in Buckeye Lake, Ohio, followed in Lingo's footsteps, and bred "Jerang Airedales." There is a kennel in Tennessee that claims to have original Oorang Airedales.

After the First World War, the Airedales' popularity rapidly increased thanks to stories of their bravery on the battlefield and also because Presidents Theodore Roosevelt, Calvin Coolidge, and Warren Harding owned Airedales. President Harding's Airedale, Laddie Boy, was the "first celebrity White House pet". 
President Harding had a special chair hand carved for him to sit on at very important Cabinet meetings. In the 1920s, the Airedale became the most popular breed in the USA.

President Roosevelt claimed that "An Airedale can do anything any other dog can do and then lick the other dog, if he has to."

1949 marked the peak of the Airedales' popularity in the USA, ranked 20th out of 110 breeds recognized by the American Kennel Club.

The Airedale Terrier was recognized by United Kennel Club in 1914.

The Airedale Terrier was recognized by the American Kennel Club in 1888.

The Airedale Terrier Club of America (ATCA), founded in 1900 is the parent club of the breed in the United States and the official-spokes organization  for the breed with the American Kennel Club (AKC).

The Airedale Terrier Club of America periodically holds performance and conformation events. The Airedale judged to be Best of Breed at these national specialty shows is awarded the Airedale Bowl.

Notable Airedales
Ruff, owned by the Mitchell family of Dennis the Menace fame.

Kitty, owned by John Jacob Astor IV, perished during the sinking of the Titanic.
Laddie Boy, owned by U.S. President Warren G. Harding.
Paddy the Wanderer
The dog Myrtle Wilson buys in The Great Gatsby is said to be an Airedale, but Nick Carraway notices it has white paws.
Muggs, "The Dog That Bit People" owned by James Thurber as described in My Life and Hard Times.
Duke, owned by American actor John Wayne (from which Wayne got his nickname).
Rufus, from Open Season 2
Unnamed Airedale, in various episodes of Family Guy
Kipper, From The 1996 live-action Disney film 101 Dalmatians
Hugo, owned by Geri Halliwell of The Spice Girls

See also
 Dogs portal
 List of dog breeds

References

Further reading
  Airedale Terriers as a working/hunting breed.
  Tells the story of the Oorang Kennel operation in LaRue, Ohio, run by Walter Lingo.
 
 
 
 
 
  Cites the Airedale as a police dog and as a dispatch bearer in war.
 
 
 
 
 
 
 
"Airedale Terriers (Barron's Complete Pet Owner's Manuals)" MAB(2010)el S.t(p203)inkt

External links

 Airedale Terrier – Full Breed Profile

Dog breeds originating in England
Terriers
FCI breeds